The 1962–63 Midland Football League season was the 63rd in the history of the Midland Football League, a football competition in England.

Clubs
The league featured 18 clubs which competed in the previous season, along with two new clubs:
Boston United
Holbeach United, joined from the Eastern Counties League

League table

References

External links

M
Midland Football League (1889)